Bielejewo refers to the following places in Poland:

 Bielejewo, Jarocin County
 Bielejewo, Szamotuły County